Mile Sterjovski (born 27 May 1979) is an Australian former football (soccer) player. Sterjovski played mainly as a right winger or as a second striker, but also played as a left winger and central midfielder. He is currently the head coach of Macarthur FC.

Sterjovski played youth football with Wollongong Wolves and the AIS before making his senior debut for Wolves in the National Soccer League. After also playing for Wollongong United, Sydney United and Parramatta Power, Sterjovski moved overseas to play for French club Lille OSC. He also spent time in Switzerland (with Basel) and Turkey (with Hacettepe) before joining Derby in the English Premier League. He eventually returned to Australia to play in the A-League for Perth Glory and Central Coast Mariners, separated by a period playing for Dalian Aerbin in the Chinese Super League. He then returned to the A-league to win the championship with the Central Coast Mariners.

He played for the Australian national team from 2000 to 2010, making 43 appearances and scoring 8 goals, including 3 games at the 2006 FIFA World Cup and an international hat-trick against Tahiti.

Club career

Junior Club
Sterjovski began playing as a junior with the Wollongong Olympic Junior Soccer Club Lake Height Junior Football Club.

Early career
Sterjovski began his career in Australia at Wollongong Wolves and briefly played for Illawarra Lions before making a name for himself with successful spells at Sydney United and Parramatta Power.

Lille OSC
Sterjovski's performances and record of 31 goals in 68 games in three National Soccer League (NSL) seasons earned him a move to French Ligue 1 side Lille in 2000. After 4 seasons at Lille, Sterjovski moved to Swiss side FC Basel.

FC Basel
On 14 May 2004 it was announced that Sterjovski had signed a three-year contract with FC Basel. He joined Basel's first team during their 2004–05 season under head coach Christian Gross. After playing in five test games Sterjovski played his domestic league debut for his new club in the home game in the St. Jakob-Park on 17 July as Basel won 6–0 against Aarau. As reigning Swiss champions, Basel entered the 2004–05 UEFA Champions League in the third qualifying round and their aim was to reach the group stage. However, they were drawn against Internazionale. Sterjovski scored his first goal for his new club on 24 August in the away game in the San Siro, Milan, as Basel were defeated 4–1 by Inter and Inter won the qualifier 5–2 on aggregate. Basel subsequently dropped into the 2004–05 UEFA Cup. Beating Terek Grozny in the first round, Basel qualified for the group stage. A 1–1 draw away against Schalke 04 was followed by a home defeat against Hearts. But with two victories, 2–1 away against Ferencvárosi TC and 1–0 at home against Feyenoord, saw Basel rise to third place in the group table and advance to the knock-out stage. In the round of 32 in the 2004–05 UEFA Cup, a home game in the St. Jakob-Park on 17 February 2005, Basel played a goalless draw against Sterjovski's former club, Lille OSC, but in the return leg Basel were defeated 2–0 and were eliminated.

Sterjovski scored his first domestic league goal with his team in the home game on 7 November. It was the first goal of the game as Basel won 2–1 against Young Boys. Basel completed all the 2004–05 Super League season's seventeen home games undefeated, winning thirteen and drawing four. They ended the season as Swiss champions with 10 points advantage over second placed Thun. In the first round of the 2004–05 Swiss Cup Basel played away against local amateur club FC Oberdorf. Sterjovski scored his first cup goal for the club in this match and Basel went on to win 4–0. In the second round they beat lower league team Meyrin 3–1. But in round three they faced Thun. Following a 1–1 draw after extra time. It required a penalty shoot-out. Sterjovski's spot kick was held by Thun keeper Fabio Coltorti and Thun won the shoot-out 4–3.

As Swiss champions, Basel entered the 2005–06 Champions League third qualifying round. However, they were drawn against German Bundesliga club Werder Bremen and they lost 4-2 on aggregate. Subsequently Basel dropped into the 2005–06 UEFA Cup, where against NK Široki Brijeg in the first round, they sealed a 6–0 aggregate win to qualify for the Group stage. Here Basel were then drawn into Group E, alongside Strasbourg, Roma, Red Star Belgrade and Tromsø. Basel qualified for the knock-out stage and in the round of 32 Basel were drawn against AS Monaco, this was won 2-1 on aggregate. In the round of 16 Basel were drawn against Strasbourgh winning 4-2 on aggregate. In the quarter-finals, drawn against Middlesbrough they won the first leg 2–0, but Middlesbrough fought back to win the return match 4–1 and the tie 4–3 on aggregate. Sterjovski played in 11 of these 12 matches. Basel started into the 2005–06 Super League season well and led the championship right until the last day of the league campaign. On the final day of the league season Basel played at home against Zürich. Mladen Petrić had scored an equaliser after FCZ had taken an early lead. But then a last-minute goal from Zürich's Iulian Filipescu meant the final score was 1-2 in favour of the away team and it gave FCZ their first national championship since 1980–81. The title for Basel was lost on goal difference. The last minute loss of the Championship and the subsequent riots, the so-called Basel Hooligan Incident, meant that the club would suffer the consequences. In the first round of the 2005–06 Swiss Cup Basel played away against lower league team Solothurn and won this 4–1. In round two they played away against local lower league team Old Boys. In this game Sterjovski scored four goals and Basel won 6–1. However, Basel were defeated in the third-round home tie against FC Zürich 3–4.

FC Basel's European campaign started in the first qualifying stage of the 2006–07 UEFA Cup, here they beat Kazakhi side FC Tobol 3–1 on aggregate. In the second qualifying round they were drawn against FC Vaduz from Liechtenstein, narrowly progressing on the away goals rule after a 2–2 aggregate draw. In the first round Basel won 7–2 on aggregate against FK Rabotnički to qualify for the group stage. Here Basel played their first match at home against Feyenoord, this ended in a 1–1 draw. Their second was away and FCB lost 3–0 against Blackburn Rovers. At home against AS Nancy the match was drawn 2–2 and the final game ended ended with a 3–1 defeat against Wisła Kraków. Basel ended the group stage in last position in the table and were eliminated. Sterjovski played in all ten of these European matches, scoring two goals. At the end of the 2006–07 Super League season Basel were runners-up, one point behind championship winners Zürich. In the Swiss Cup Basel advanced to the final, beating FC Liestal in the first round, Lugano, FC Baulmes, Aarau and Wil in the semi-final. In the final they played Luzern and won this 1–0 thanks to a penalty goal in the third minute of added time.

Sterjovski’s contract was not renewed and so he left the club. During his time with them, Sterjovski played a total of 171 games for Basel scoring a total of 38 goals. 93 of these games were in the Swiss Super League, 11 in the Swiss Cup, 30 in the UEFA competitions (Champions League and UEFA Cup) and 37 were friendly games. He scored 15 goals in the domestic league, seven in the cup, three in the European games and the other 13 were scored during the test games.

Gençlerbirliği
On 2 September 2007, Sterjovski scored on his debut after coming off the bench for his new club Gençlerbirliği OFTAŞ (now called Hacettepe Spor Kulübü) in their match against Fenerbahçe.

Derby County
On 9 January 2008, Sterjovski announced his plan to leave Turkey for personal reasons relating to his family. He announced that he was in negotiations with Premier League side Derby County and joined them after work permit problems on 24 January 2008. He made his debut as a substitute against Tottenham in a 3–0 defeat, and was a regular in the side towards the end of the season, usually playing out on the right wing.

In the 2008–09 season, Sterjovski was largely frozen out of the Derby squad by manager Paul Jewell, his first appearance of the season coming on 21 October 2008 against Blackpool, in which he scored his first goal for Derby. However, following Jewell's departure, he produced an impressive performance against Manchester United in the first leg of the League Cup semi-final under caretaker manager David Lowe. New Derby manager Nigel Clough was watching in the stands. Following the match, Sterjovski said: "Now I am glad there is a new manager. It’s a new start for me and, hopefully, I will get more chances." Sterjovski went on to make 14 further appearances before the end of the season, scoring once and playing well in the middle of the injury-hit Derby midfield.

Return to Australia: Perth Glory
After initial speculation linking Sterjovski with a move to Gold Coast United, he moved to Perth Glory on 11 June 2009 for an undisclosed fee on a three-year contract as their marquee player.

Central Coast Mariners
On 6 July 2012 it was announced he had signed one-year deal to play for Central Coast Mariners.
On 5 February 2014, Sterjovski announced that he will retire at the end of the season.

International career

Sterjovski made his Australian national team debut against Scotland in 2000.
Sterjovski was selected to represent Australia at the 2006 FIFA World Cup in Germany. In the build-up, he made an appearance in the Australia vs. Greece friendly at the Melbourne Cricket Ground and also played against Liechtenstein, scoring the first goal for the Socceroos in a 3–1 win. In the finals he started in the games against Brazil and against Croatia.

Sterjovski was selected for the first group match in Australia's 2007 Asian Cup campaign, starting against Oman and substituted in the 46th minute, which Australia drew 1–1. Due to illness Sterjovski did not feature further in Australia's failed campaign in its first Asian Cup.
Sterjovski scored against Ghana during a friendly match at the Sydney Football Stadium, but was sent off in the 85th minute after receiving a second yellow card for a tackle on Ghana's Richard Manu. He scored again on 20 August in a friendly against South Africa in which the Socceroos drew 2–2.
On 10 June 2009, Sterjovski notched his 9th goal for Australia in a 2–0 win over Bahrain at the ANZ Stadium in Sydney, in his 41st appearance for his national side.

Personal life
Sterjovski and his wife Sharon have two sons and a daughter - Luka, Sonny and Lilly.

A-League career statistics

Chinese League career statistics
(Correct as of 24 June 2012)

International career statistics
Source:#

Honours

Sydney United
NSL Minor Premiership:
Winner (1): 1999

FC Basel
Swiss Super League:
Winner (1): 2004–05
Runner-up (2): 2005–06, 2006–07
Swiss Cup:
Winner (1): 2007
UEFA Cup:
Quarter-finals (1): 2006

Derby County
League Cup:
Semi-finals (1): 2009

Perth Glory
Club Golden Boot Award: 2010

Central Coast Mariners
A-League Championship: 2013

International
Confederations Cup:
Third place (1): 2001
Oceania Nations Cup:
Winner (1): 2004

References

Sources
 Die ersten 125 Jahre. Publisher: Josef Zindel im Friedrich Reinhardt Verlag, Basel. 
 Verein "Basler Fussballarchiv" Homepage
 FCB portrait Mile Sterjovski (German)

External links

 Mile Sterjovski Interview
 OzFootball profile
 
 FFA – Socceroo profile
 Perth Glory profile
 

1979 births
Living people
Sportspeople from Wollongong
Australian people of Macedonian descent
Australian soccer players
Australia international soccer players
Australia youth international soccer players
Australia under-20 international soccer players
Ligue 1 players
Premier League players
Swiss Super League players
Süper Lig players
Derby County F.C. players
FC Basel players
Hacettepe S.K. footballers
Lille OSC players
Parramatta Power players
Sydney United 58 FC players
Perth Glory FC players
Dalian Professional F.C. players
Chinese Super League players
A-League Men players
Australian Institute of Sport soccer players
Central Coast Mariners FC players
Wollongong Wolves FC players
Association football forwards
Association football midfielders
Association football wingers
Marquee players (A-League Men)
Australian Macedonian soccer managers
Australian expatriate soccer players
Expatriate footballers in England
Expatriate footballers in France
Expatriate footballers in Turkey
Expatriate footballers in Switzerland
Expatriate footballers in China
Australian expatriate sportspeople in England
Australian expatriate sportspeople in France
Australian expatriate sportspeople in Turkey
Australian expatriate sportspeople in Switzerland
Australian expatriate sportspeople in China
Olympic soccer players of Australia
Footballers at the 2000 Summer Olympics
2001 FIFA Confederations Cup players
2004 OFC Nations Cup players
2005 FIFA Confederations Cup players
2006 FIFA World Cup players
2007 AFC Asian Cup players
Wollongong United FC players